Glyptophysa novaehollandica is a freshwater species of gastropod mollusk in the family Planorbidae.

Description
The length of an adult shell may exceed 30 mm. The shells of adult G. novaehollandica are very variable, often have relatively smooth shells. Some specimens or populations may also have periostracal hairs and spirals present.

Distribution
This species occurs in all states and territories of Australia, including Tasmania. Specimens from Papua New Guinea and East Timor may also prove to be this species.

Taxonomy 
The taxonomy of all Glyptophysa is very poorly understood. Ponder, Hallan, Shea, and Clark, 2016, recognize three species of Glyptophysa, with the addition of Glyptophysa aliciae.

Glyptophysa novaehollandica is currently classified as follows:

Class: Gastropoda

Subclass: Heterobranchia

Order: Hygrophila

Superfamily: Planorboidea

Family: Planorbidae

Genus: Glyptophysa Crosse, 1872

Subgenus: Glyptophysa

Original name: Physa novaehollandica Bowdich, 1822 (as Physa n.hollandica). Bowdich, T. E. (1822). Elements of Conchology Pt. 1. Paris.

Type locality: Assumed to be New Holland (= Australia), based on the name.

Synonyms: Physa novaehollandiae Lesson, 1831; Physa novaehollandiae Gray, 1833; Physa ludwigii Küster, 1844; Physa gibbosa Gould, 1846; Physa pectorosa Conrad, 1850;  Physa australiana Conrad, 1850; Physa concinna Adams and Angas, 1864; Physa olivacea Adams and Angas, 1864; Physa badia Adams and Angas, 1864; Physa aciculata Sowerby, 1873;  Physa dispar Sowerby, 1873; Physa pyramidata Sowerby, 1873; Physa tenuistriata Sowerby, 1873;  Physa subundata Sowerby, 1873; Aplexa adamsiana Tapparone-Canefri 1874; Physa duplicata G. B. Sowerby, 1874;  Physa aperta Sowerby, 1874; Physa nitida Sowerby, 1874; Physa attenuata Sowerby, 1874; Physa pinguis Sowerby, 1874; Physa brunniensis Sowerby, 1874; Physa eburnea Sowerby, 1874; Physa mamillata Sowerby, 1874; Physa nitida Sowerby, 1874; Physa texturata Sowerby, 1874; Physa bullata Sowerby, 1874; Physa kershawi Tenison-Woods, 1878; Physa huonensis Tenison-Woods, 1876; Physa legrandi Tenison-Woods, 1876; Physa tasmanica Tenison-Woods, 1876; Physa huonicolaTenison-Woods, 1876; Physa tasmanicola Tenison-Woods, 1876; Physa ciliata Tenison-Woods, 1876; Physa yarraensis Tenison-Woods, 1878; Physa diemenensis Johnston, 1879; Physa fumiformis Nelson and Taylor, 1879; Physa beddomei Nelson and Taylor, 1879;  Physa brisbanica Nelson and Taylor, 1879; Aplexa turrita Tate, 1881; Physa exarata Smith, 1882; Physa gracilenta Smith, 1882;  Physa etheridgei Smith, 1882; Physa queenslandica Smith, 1882; Physa lessoni Smith, 1882; Physa grayi Smith, 1882; Physa smithi Clessin, 1885; Physa kreffti  Clessin, 1886; Physa multispirata Clessin, 1886;  Physa conica Clessin, 1886;  Physa lincolnensis Clessin, 1886; Physa waterhousei Clessin, 1886; Physa producta Smith, 1882; Physa tortuosa Clessin, 1886. Physa arachnoidea Tenison-Woods, 1878; Isidora gibbosa brevispira Odhner, 1917; Bullinus tenuistriatus confluens Hedley, 1917; Amerianna subacuta Cotton and Beasley, 1941; Glyptamoda ellea Iredale, 1943;   Tasmadora sorellensis Cotton, 1943; Glyptamoda orta Iredale, 1944; Lenameria calda  Iredale, 1944; Lenameria digressa  Iredale, 1944; Lenameria epicropa  Iredale, 1944; Lenameria formalis Iredale, 1944; Lenameria placata  Iredale, 1944; Lenameria pretena  Iredale, 1944; Lenameria renola  Iredale, 1943; Mutalena modica Iredale, 1944; Mutalena raperta Iredale, 1944.

References

External links
 Ponder W.F., Hallan A., Shea M. and Clark S.A. (2016). Australian Freshwater Molluscs

Planorbidae